Voyages de l'autre côté is a novel written in French by French Nobel laureate writer J. M. G. Le Clézio.

Translation of the book's title
Voyages de l'autre côté  could be translated  as Journeys to the Other Side.

Publication history

First French Edition

References

1975 French novels
Novels by J. M. G. Le Clézio
Works by J. M. G. Le Clézio
Éditions Gallimard books